Pigott and Piggott are English surnames.

The Pigott Baronetcy is a title in the Baronetage of Great Britain.

Derivation and variants
The name Pigott / Piggott is derived from Picot. The latter is recorded as a given name in the Domesday Book, but its origin is not clear. It may stem from the Germanic or Old English pic, a sharply pointed hill, being applied to residents living near such a feature, or could have been used for a tall, this person as pic could mean a sharp or pointed tool. William Camden suggested a derivation from Old French picote meaning pock-marked, freckled.

Pigot and Pickett are variant forms.

People with the surname Pigott
 Donald Pigott (1928–2022), British botanist
 Edward Pigott (1753–1825), English astronomer, son of Nathaniel, also an astronomer
 Eugene F. Pigott Jr. (born 1946), American jurist
 Florence Pigott (died 1899), English operatic singer and ballet dancer
 Francis Pigott Stainsby Conant (1810–1863), British politician
 Fred Pigott (1895–1979), British mountaineer
 Gwyn Hanssen Pigott (1935–2013), Australian potter
 Jean Pigott (born 1924), Canadian politician
 Joe Pigott (born 1993), English footballer
 John Pigott  (c. 1550 – by 1627), English politician
 Marjorie Pigott (1904–1990), Canadian artist
 Mark Pigott (born 1954), American businessman
 Nathaniel Pigott (1725–1804), English astronomer
 Nick Pigott (born 1951), British editor of The Railway Magazine
 Richard Pigott (1835–1889), Irish journalist and forger
 Stuart Pigott (born 1960), British wine critic 
 Tim Pigott-Smith (born 1946), British actor
 Tony Pigott (born 1958), English cricketer
 William Pigott (1839–1909), English-born Australian politician
 William Trigg Pigott (1860–1944), Justice of the Montana Supreme Court

People with the surname Piggott
 Derek Piggott (1922–2019), British glider pilot
 Emeline Piggott (1836–1919), Confederate States of America spy
 Francis Taylor Piggott (1852–1925), British jurist and scholar of Japan
 Jim Piggott, Canadian ice hockey player, after whom the Jim Piggott Memorial Trophy is named
 Joan R. Piggott (born 1947), American historian
 Lester Piggott (1935–2022), British jockey
 Marcus Piggott, Welsh fashion photographer
 Pércival Piggott (born 1966), Panamanian footballer
 Rosslynd Piggott (born 1958), Australian  installation artist and painter
 Stuart Piggott (1910–1996), British archaeologist
 Tracy Piggott (born 1966), British jockey and broadcaster working in Ireland, daughter of Lester Piggott
 Victor Herrera Piggott (born 1980), Panamanian footballer
 William Roy Piggott (1914–2008), British scientist

Fictional characters
 Owd Grandad Piggott, character on BBC Radio Stoke
 William Piggott, minor character in Coronation Street, 1964

See also
Pigot (surname)
Pigott (disambiguation): other meanings
Piggott (disambiguation)

References

Surnames of English origin